Danièle Graule (1 October 1944 – 18 July 2022), known as Dani, was a French actress and singer.

Biography 

Dani was born in Castres. In 1966 she was contracted to Pathé-Marconi and released her first single Garçon manqué. In 1968 Papa vient d'épouser la bonne sold a million copies and was a major hit. Dani was meant to have been France's Eurovision Song Contest 1974 entry with the song "La Vie à 25 ans", but President Georges Pompidou died in the week of the competition, so she never entered Eurovision properly. Her only English language record release to date was "That Old Familiar Feeling", which had the same music as "La Vie à 25 ans" but with English lyrics by British singer-songwriter Lynsey de Paul.

On the cinema screen, she played the script-girl Liliane in François Truffaut's Day for Night and in the last Antoine Doinel-adventure Love on the Run a short-time-affair of Antoine, Christine's friend Liliane.  Truffaut who made her famous with one role in two movies: she is Liliane in Day for Night. The fickle girlfriend of actor Alphonse (Jean-Pierre Léaud) recruited as a script trainee who is pinching for the English stuntman. In 1978, this Liliane became the friend of Christine Doinel alias Claude Jade in the final film of the Doinel cyclus. Truffaut used Liliane's flashbacks for Love on the Run. Here Liliane becomes the best friend of Christine (Claude Jade). And later, she has an affair with her husband Antoine, again Jean-Pierre Léaud. Thanks to the installation of new and old scenes, Claude Jade also mounted in the flashbacks of Day for Night, it seems Dani was already part of the Doinel Cycle.

She died in Tours on 18 July 2022, aged 77.

Discography

Albums 

 1970 : Dani
 1977 : Les Migrateurs
 1993 : N Comme Never Again

Selected filmography 

 1970: Tumuc Humac by Jean-Marie Périer, with Marc Porel and François Périer
 1973: Quelques messieurs trop tranquilles by Georges Lautner, with Bruno Pradal
 1973: Un officier de police sans importance by Jean Larriaga, with Marc Porel
 1973: Day for Night by François Truffaut, with Jean-Pierre Léaud, Jacqueline Bisset
 1976: Les Anneaux de Bicêtre by Louis Grospierre, with Michel Bouquet, Claude Jade
 1979: Love on the Run by François Truffaut, with Jean-Pierre Léaud, Claude Jade
 1988: Story of Women by Claude Chabrol, with Isabelle Huppert, François Cluzet
 2006: Avenue Montaigne by Danièle Thompson, with Cécile de France, Valérie Lemercier
 2018: Guy by Alex Lutz, with Alex Lutz, Pascale Arbillot, Élodie Bouchez

References

External links 
 
 

1944 births
2022 deaths
People from Castres
French women singers
French film actresses
French female models
Eurovision Song Contest entrants of 1974
Eurovision Song Contest entrants for France